Thorens-Glières is a former commune in the Haute-Savoie department in the Auvergne-Rhône-Alpes region in south-eastern France. On 1 January 2017, it was merged into the new commune Fillière. It is the birthplace of St. Francis de Sales.

Notable people
 Nedd Willard

See also
Communes of the Haute-Savoie department

References

Former communes of Haute-Savoie
Populated places disestablished in 2017